Jean-Robert Toussaint (born 5 April 1966) is a former soccer player who had stints in the USISL Pro League, and the Canadian Soccer League. Born in Haiti, he represented Canada at youth international level.

Professional career 
Toussaint began his career in the Canadian Soccer League in 1988 with the Montreal Supra, and had a stint with the New Hampshire Ramblers of the USISL Pro League in 1995. In 2005, he was appointed head coach for the Laval Dynamites of the Canadian Professional Soccer League. He brought in the likes of Nicolas Lesage, Rachid Madkour, and Mohamed Ridouani. He achieved a third-place finish in the Eastern Conference which secured a postseason berth for the club. In the playoffs, he led Laval to the semi-finals where they faced Toronto Croatia, but lost to a score of 1–0.

Personal life
Toussaint's son Cédric is also a soccer player.

He was a coach for the Dragons of the Collège Saint-Jean Vianney

References

External links

1966 births
Living people
Association football midfielders
Canadian soccer coaches
Canadian soccer players
Haitian footballers
People from Nord (Haitian department)
Soccer players from Montreal
Haitian emigrants to Canada
Naturalized citizens of Canada
Canadian expatriate soccer players
Haitian expatriate footballers
Expatriate soccer players in the United States
Canadian expatriate sportspeople in the United States
Haitian expatriate sportspeople in the United States
Hartford Hawks men's soccer players
Montreal Supra players
Canadian Soccer League (1987–1992) players
USL Second Division players
Canada men's youth international soccer players
Canadian Soccer League (1998–present) managers